Sushant Divgikar  is an Indian model, actor, singer, columnist, psychologist, motivational speaker, drag queen, pageant director, and video jockey.

In July 2014, they were crowned Mr Gay India 2014. They represented India at Mr Gay World 2014. They won various special awards during Mr Gay World 2014, and have been the only delegate from India to win three sub awards. Divgikar is the first Indian and the first delegate from any country to have won a record 3 individual sub titles and 2 group sub titles at the Mr Gay World 2014 contest.

They participated in the television reality show Bigg Boss 8.

Divgikar, in their drag queen avatar Rani Ko-HE-Nur, created history by becoming the first drag queen in India to participate in a singing reality show and win the golden buzzer, making Rani / Sushant the first contestant from the LGBTQIA+ community to win a golden buzzer and directly enter the top 15 of the reality competition show Sa Re Ga Ma Pa in the year 2018. In 2021, under their drag person, they were announced to be competing in the premiere season of Queen of the Universe, an international singing competition for drag performers. The series premiered on December 2, 2021.

Divgikar has featured in many television shows and has worked with most of the leading broadcasting channels, agencies and production houses, nationally and internationally.

Early life and background
Divgikar was born and raised in the western suburbs of Mumbai, Maharashtra, India, in their family home in Bandra West. Divgikar was born to Goan Konkani parents, Pradeep Divgikar and Bharati Divgikar. Their father, Pradeep is a retired Assistant Commissioner, Indian Customs and Central Excise and former President of the Greater Mumbai Amateur Aquatics Association (GMAAA).

Career
Divgikar started their TV career with UTV Bindass's Big Switch Season 3 directed by Rohit Shetty. They then did Atyachaar Ka Punchnama for UTV Bindass as a host. They were a contestant on Color TV's Bigg Boss 8. They participated in Mr Gay World 2014. They were among the top 10 finalists and is the first person in the history of the pageant to have three sub awards - Mister Gay World Congeniality 2014, Mister People's Choice & Mister Gay World Art 2014. They have also worked on TV commercials for brands like Maruti Suzuki, MTV India, Channel V India, Idea mobiles. Alongside acting and TV, they won several awards and titles between 2011 and 2013.

In 2015, they were the guest in Colors TV's India's Got Talent and Zoom's Style Panga. They were also the guest in the grand finale of &TV's Killerr Karaoke Atka Toh Latkah. Two documentary films, both based on his life, have been nominated and screened at various national and international festivals. Presently, they will soon be seen in an online series Love, Life and Screw Ups.

Divgikar, both in and out of drag, was listed as one of GQ's 50 Most Influential Young Indians of 2018.

Queen of the Universe 

In November 2021, they were announced as one of fourteen contestants on the debut season of Queen of the Universe, an international drag queen singing competition, and a spin-off of RuPaul's Drag Race.

Filmography

Television

Music videos

Web series

Discography

Singles

Featured singles

Awards and nominations
Mr. Gay world India 2014 - Won
Mr. Congeniality, Mr. Gay world 2014 - Won
Mr. People's choice, Mr. Gay world 2014 - Won
Mr. Arts challenge, Mr. Gay world, 2014 - Nominated
Team sports challenge, Mr. Gay world 2014 - Nominated
Team Arts challenge, Mr. Gay world 2014 - Nominated
Mr. Gay world, 2014, Rome - Top 10 Grand Finalist
Best Anchor in a reality or music and danced based, Indian Television Academy Awards (Atyachaar Ka Punchnama) - Nominated

Personal life
Divgikar has an older brother, Karan Divgikar, who works as a flight attendant at Qatar Airways. Divgikar is a certified Psychologist and holds a master's degree in Industrial psychology.

In January 2021, Divgikar came out as genderfluid via an Instagram post, stating their pronouns are "he", "she", and "they".

See also
 Mr Gay India
 Mr India World
 Prateik Jain
 Queen of the Universe (TV series)

References

Living people
Indian male models
Indian gay actors
Indian LGBT entertainers
Gay models
Indian beauty pageant winners
Marathi people
Male beauty pageant winners
Bigg Boss (Hindi TV series) contestants
Year of birth missing (living people)
Non-binary models
Non-binary drag performers
Indian non-binary actors
Indian drag queens
21st-century Indian singers
Indian television actors
Queen of the Universe contestants
Genderfluid people
LGBT psychologists